Gold Award for Best Actor in a Lead Role – Male is an award given as part of its annual Gold Awards to recognise a male actor who has delivered an outstanding performance in a leading role on Hindi television.

The award was first awarded in 2007 under the title Best Actor in a Lead Role. A special award called Best Actor – Critics or Best Actor – Jury was also awarded occasionally in 2000s, whose winner was selected by the jury of critics assigned to the function.

The jury award was awarded without prior nominations until 2012. Since then, the jury award is also awarded with prior nominations just like the original award which is now called Best Actor – Popular.

Superlatives

Multiple winners 
 4 Wins: Karan Patel
 3 Wins: Shabbir Ahluwalia
 2 Wins: Sushant Singh Rajput

List of winners

2000s
2007 Rajeev Khandelwal - Left Right Left as Captain Rajveer Singh Shekhawat
Ram Kapoor - Kasamh Se as Jai Walia
Rohit Roy - Viraasat as Rahul Lamba
Shabbir Ahluwalia - Kayamath as Milind Mishra
Sharad Malhotra - Banoo Main Teri Dulhann as Sagar Pratap Singh
Sushant Singh - Virrudh as Sushant
2008 Shabbir Ahluwalia - Kayamath as Milind Mishra
Sharad Malhotra - Banoo Main Teri Dulhann as Sagar Pratap Singh / Amar Shivdhar Upadhyay
Angad Hasija - Sapna Babul Ka...Bidaai as Alekh Rajvansh
Harshad Chopda - Kis Desh Mein Hai Meraa Dil as Prem Juneja
Karan Singh Grover - Dill Mill Gaye as Dr. Armaan Mallik
Ram Kapoor - Kasamh Se as Jai Walia
2009 Not Held

2010s
2010 Sushant Singh Rajput - Pavitra Rishta as Manav Deshmukh
Arhaan Behl - Mann Kee Awaaz Pratigya as Krishna Singh
Iqbal Khan - Sanjog Se Bani Sangini as Rudra
Karan Mehra - Yeh Rishta Kya Kehlata Hai as Naitik
Nandish Sandhu - Uttaran  as Veer Singh Bundela
Ronit Roy - Bandini as Dharamraj Mahiyanshi
2011 Sushant Singh Rajput - Pavitra Rishta as Manav Deshmukh
Harshad Chopda - Tere Liye as Anurag Ganguly
Arhaan Behl - Mann Kee Awaaz Pratigya as Krishna Singh
Karan Mehra - Yeh Rishta Kya Kehlata Hai as Naitik
Nandish Sandhu - Uttaran  as Veer Singh Bundela
Ronit Roy - Bandini as Dharamraj Mahiyanshi
2012 Ram Kapoor - Bade Achhe Lagte Hain as Ram Kapoor
Samir Soni  - Parichay - Nayee Zindagi Kay Sapno Ka as Kunal Chopra
Anas Rashid - Diya Aur Baati Hum as Sooraj Arun Rathi
Gurmeet Chaudhary - Geet - Hui Sabse Parayi as Maan Singh Khurana
Hiten Tejwani - Pavitra Rishta as Manav Damodar Deshmukh
Ronit Roy - Adaalat as KD Pathak
2013 Karan Singh Grover - Qubool Hai as Asad Ahmed Khan and Sidharth shukla -Balika vadhu as Shivraj Shekhar
Anas Rashid - Diya Aur Baati Hum as Sooraj Arun Rathi
Vivian Dsena - Madhubala - Ek Ishq Ek Junoon as Rishabh Mohan Kundra (RK)
Gurmeet Chaudhary - Punar Vivaah as Yash Suraj Pratap Sindhia
Mohit Raina - Devon Ke Dev...Mahadev as Shiva
Ram Kapoor - Bade Achhe Lagte Hain As Ram Kapoor
2014 Karan Patel - Yeh Hai Mohabbatein as Raman Kumar Bhalla (tied with)Gautam Rode - Saraswatichandra as Saraswatichandra
Rajat Tokas - Jodha Akbar as Akbar
Mohit Raina - Devon Ke Dev...Mahadev as Shiva
Anas Rashid - Diya Aur Baati Hum as Sooraj Arun Rathi
Shaheer Sheikh - Mahabharat as Arjuna
Ashish Sharma - Rangrasiya as Rudra
2015 Karan Patel - Yeh Hai Mohabbatein as Raman Kumar Bhalla
Ronit Roy - Itna Karo Na Mujhe Pyar as Nachiket Neil Khanna
Shakti Arora - Meri Aashiqui Tumse Hi as Ranveer Kailash Vaghela
Ravi Dubey - Jamai Raja as Siddharth Khurana
Shabbir Ahluwalia - Kumkum Bhagya as Abhishek Prem Mehra
Sharad Malhotra - Bharat Ka Veer Putra – Maharana Pratap as Maharana Pratap
2016 Karan Patel - Yeh Hai Mohabbatein as Raman Kumar Bhalla (tied with) Shabbir Ahluwalia - Kumkum Bhagya as Abhishek Prem Mehra
Arjun Bijlani - Naagin (season 1) as Ritik Singh
Sharad Malhotra - Kasam - Tere Pyaar Ki as Rishi Singh Bedi
Ravi Dubey - Jamai Raja as Siddharth Khurana
Anas Rashid - Diya Aur Baati Hum as Sooraj Arun Rathi
2017 Karan Patel - Yeh Hai Mohabbatein  as Raman Kumar Bhalla
Karanvir Bohra - Naagin (season 2) as Rocky Pratap Singh
Shabbir Ahluwalia - Kumkum Bhagya as Abhishek Prem Mehra
Sharad Malhotra - Kasam Tere Pyaar Ki as Rishi Singh Bedi 
Nakuul Mehta - Ishqbaaz as Shivaay Singh Oberoi
2018 Nakuul Mehta - Ishqbaaz as Shivaay Singh Oberoi (tied with) Shabbir Ahluwalia - Kumkum Bhagya as Abhishek Prem Mehra   
Mohsin Khan - Yeh Rishta Kya Kehlata Hai as Kartik Goenka
Dheeraj Dhoopar - Kundali Bhagya as Karan Luthra
Karan Patel - Ye Hai Mohabbatein as Raman Kumar Bhalla
Harshad Chopda - Bepannah as Aditya Hooda

2019 Dheeraj Dhoopar - Kundali Bhagya as Karan Luthra (tied with) Mohsin Khan - Yeh Rishta Kya Kehlata Hai as Kartik Goenka
Shabbir Ahluwalia - Kumkum Bhagya as Abhishek Prem Mehra
Parth Samthaan - Kasautii Zindagii Kay (2018 TV series) as Anurag Basu
Pearl V Puri - Naagin (season 3) as Mahir Sehgal
Shaheer Sheikh - Yeh Rishtey Hain Pyaar Ke as Abir Rajvansh
Mohit Malik - Kulfi Kumar Bajewala as Sikander Singh Gill

References

Gold Awards
TV awards for lead actor